Intrall, or International Truck Alliance, is a Russo-British automotive company with headquarters in London, England, and manufacturing in Poland.  At the end of 2003, the company acquired from Intrall Treasury factory of Daewoo Motor Poland in Lublin, then operating from January 2004 to 2007 years, called Intrall Polska (Intrall Poland).  Under the new production in 2005, FSC Lublin and Honker models were produced under the Intrall brand.  In 2006 the company acquired the rights to produce models of trucks of the Czech brand Praga.  A brand-new commercial van/truck was developed called the Intrall Lubo.

Production was suspended in 2007 as tougher engine emission requirements were implemented, plus the Polish government (a major customer) required all Polish-military providers to be at least 50% owned by Polish interests. In October 2007, Intrall Polska was declared bankrupt by Polish court. In 2007, Intrall was declared bankrupt in London court.

Products

Lublin vehicles
 Lublin Furgon all metal van
 Lublin Furgon with raised roof
 Lublin Towas work van
 Lublin Kombi
 Lublin Skrzyniowy flatbed
 Lublin Brygadowy four door flatbed
 Lublin Kontener - box body
 Lublin special vehicles
 Police, fire an emergency vehicles

Honker vehicles

 Honker hardtop
 Honker Softtop
 Honker Skorpion - desert patrol vehicle 
 Honker Sibil - civil version of the Skorpion
 Honker special vehicles
 Military ambulance

Gallery

See also
Honker

References

Polish Wikipedia
Intrall. [w:] Samochody Świata 2007. Wyd. Media Connection, Warszawa, s. 220.

External links
 Official site
 Polish company Official site 

Car manufacturers of Poland
Motor vehicle manufacturers based in London
Defunct truck manufacturers of the United Kingdom
Truck manufacturers of Poland